Euchilichthys boulengeri is a species of upside-down catfish endemic to the Democratic Republic of the Congo where it is found in the Lulua River near Kananga.  This species grows to a length of  TL.

References
 
 

Mochokidae
Catfish of Africa
Fish of the Democratic Republic of the Congo
Endemic fauna of the Democratic Republic of the Congo
Fish described in 1934